This is the list of presidents of Abruzzo since 1970.

Elected by the Regional Council (1970–1995)

Directly-elected presidents (since 1995)

Notes

</onlyinclude>

  
Politics of Abruzzo
Abruzzo